Benkenstein is a surname. Notable people with the surname include:

Dale Benkenstein (born 1974), South African cricketer
Jacqui Benkenstein (born 1974), South African field hockey player
Luc Benkenstein (born 2004), South African cricketer
Martin Benkenstein (born 1950), South African cricketer